Boyd H. Anderson High School (also called "Boyd Anderson", or "B.A."), is a suburban public high school located in Lauderdale Lakes, Florida. It is a part of Broward County Public Schools.

Boyd H. Anderson serves: all of Lauderdale Lakes, and parts of Tamarac, North Lauderdale, Oakland Park, Fort Lauderdale and Lauderhill.

The school is named after the third County Judge of Broward County, Boyd H. Anderson Sr., who served from 1933 to 1968.

The school mascot is the cobra and the school colors are orange and black.

Academics
Boyd Anderson had a Florida Comprehensive Assessment Test school grade of "C" for the 2011–2012 academic year.

Boyd Anderson High School is the first public school in Broward County to contain an accredited International Baccalaureate diploma program as a magnet program. It gained this distinction in December 1985. In September 2005, it began offering the "Middle Years" program.

The school also has a Health and Wellness magnet program. Additionally, the school offers dual enrollment courses such as ENC101 Composition, Transportation, and Safety.

Athletics
The school's track and field teams reached three state championships in Track and Field (1995, 1997, 2000), three state championships in Cross Country (1992, 1996, 1998), and ranked #2 nationally in Track and Field (1998), and 18th in Cross Country. They won the 5A Basketball State Championship in 1994.

Debate
In addition to successful athletic programs, the school also had success in forensics or speech & debate. In 2010 a debate team started at Boyd Anderson that competed in the Florida Forensic League. In the second year of the debate team, two Boyd Anderson Students advanced from the South Florida region to the National Forensic League National Championship Tournament.

Service organizations
Boyd Anderson also maintains several community service-based organizations including: Key Club, Students Helping Achieve Philanthropic Excellence, Ladies of Distinction, Brother to Brother, Sister to Sister, and Gentlemen of Distinction.

Demographics
As of the 2021-2022 school year, the total student enrollment was 1,879. The ethnic makeup of the school was 90.6% Black, 9.8% White, 9.4% Hispanic, 1.3% Multiracial, 0.7% Asian, 0.4% Native American or Native Alaskan, and 0.2% Pacific Islander.

Notable alumni
Ivan Aska (born 1990), basketball player in the Israeli National League
 Anthony Bell, former NFL linebacker, St. Louis Cardinals
 Stephen Bier (aka Madonna Wayne Gacy), keyboardist for Marilyn Manson
 Don Blackmon, former NFL linebacker, New England Patriots
 Shaun Bridgmohan, first Jamaican in the Kentucky Derby
 Josh Bynes, former Auburn University and current Baltimore Ravens linebacker
 David L Cook, Emmy Award-winning Recording Artist.
 Todd Devoe, former NFL wide receiver, Denver Broncos
 Michael Frater, olympic Finalist olympic 2008
 Abdul Hodge, NFL linebacker, Green Bay Packers
 Eddie Jackson, NFL safety for the Chicago Bears
 JoJo Natson, NFL wide receiver and return specialist, Indianapolis Colts New York Jets and Los Angeles Rams
 Mitch Richmond, Hall of Fame NBA player
 Scott Rothstein, pleaded guilty to running a $1.2 billion investment scam
 Asante Samuel, NFL cornerback, Atlanta Falcons
 Benny Sapp, NFL cornerback, Kansas City Chiefs
 Richard Smith, former wide receiver, Kansas City Chiefs and Washington Redskins
 Tim Golden NFL Linebacker New England Pats

References

International Baccalaureate schools in Florida
Broward County Public Schools
High schools in Broward County, Florida
Public high schools in Florida